The Mexico–Hermosa Transmission Line is a 230,000 volt, double-circuit line that connects Mexico and Hermosa substations of National Grid Corporation of the Philippines (NGCP).

Route description 
The Mexico–Hermosa Transmission Line was originally commissioned by the government-owned National Power Corporation (NAPOCOR). Since 2009, it is now operated and maintained by privately-owned National Grid Corporation of the Philippines (NGCP). The transmission line passes through the municipalities of Mexico, Bacolor, Guagua, and Lubao in Pampanga and Hermosa in Bataan, and the city of San Fernando which is also located in Pampanga. It is located within the service area of NGCP's North Luzon Operations and Maintenance (NLOM) Districts 5 (Western Central Plain) and 6 (South Central Plain). Mostly uses lattice towers, steel poles are located on some portions of the line and they either come in a three-level steel pole or bipole towers. H-frame wood pole was also used on East Gate Village before it was replaced with a three-level pole. 

It starts at Barangay San Jose Matulid in Mexico, passes into East Gate Village, and crosses into Hermosa–Duhat–Balintawak transmission line upon crossing North Luzon Expressway (NLEx) and Jose Abad Santos Avenue. After crossing NLEx, it turns right, passes into residential areas within San Fernando, and crosses into MacArthur Highway. The line then turns left and crosses again with Jose Abad Santos Avenue and Hermosa–Duhat–Balintawak transmission line. It will also cross and run parallel with the Hermosa–San Jose transmission line from lattice towers 28 to 37. After the intersection of Guagua–Sta Rita Road and Jose Abad Santos Avenue, it will now parallel with the Hermosa–Guagua 69,000 volt line. The power line then continues on a straight route, crosses into Jose Abad Santos Avenue for the third time and Hermosa–Duhat–Balintawak line for the fourth time, and turns right. At Lubao, the line crosses into Jose Abad Santos Avenue for the fourth time and Hermosa–Duhat–Balintawak line for the fifth time. It turns to the left and continues until the line turns right upon approaching Hermosa Substation, where it ends.

Improvements 
The National Transmission Corporation (TransCo) relocated its Bacolor–Guagua section through the Lahar-Affected Transmission Line Relocation Project, using 19 replacement steel towers. It was completed in April 2003.

In 2015, wood pole 5A was replaced with a more durable three-level steel pole.

The reconductoring of a line was done in 2017, with four new bipole towers (totalling to 8 steel poles) and poles near Hermosa Substation which were erected earlier in 2018.

References

Energy infrastructure completed in 1991
Transmission lines in the Philippines